Following the end of World War II in Asia, France attempted to regain control of Vietnam, as part of French Indochina, which it had lost to Japan in 1941. At the conclusion of the First Indochina War, the country was split into two parts, the North and the South. The southern part was named the State of Vietnam under the leadership of former Emperor Bảo Đại. In 1950, the United States recognized the Bảo Đại government, established diplomatic relations, and sent its first ambassador to Saigon in South Vietnam, officially known as the Republic of Vietnam following the rise of President Ngô Đình Diệm in 1955. The US was opposed to the communist government of the North, led by Chairman Hồ Chí Minh, and did not recognize the northern regime.

At the end of the Vietnam War, the US Embassy in Saigon was shuttered and all embassy personnel evacuated on April 29, 1975, just prior to the capture of Saigon by North Vietnamese and Việt Cộng forces. Since the normalization of United States–Vietnam relations in 1995, the US Consulate General in Ho Chi Minh City stands adjacent to the site of the former embassy which was demolished in 1998. The US Ambassador to Vietnam is now seated in the US Embassy in Hanoi, the former capital city of North Vietnam and the current capital of the unified Socialist Republic of Vietnam.

Ambassadors

Deputy Ambassadors

Notes

Sources
US Department of State: Chiefs of Mission for South Vietnam

 
Ambassador
South Vietnam
United States
Ambassador to South Vietnam
20th-century American diplomats
Cold War diplomats